Stephanie Sigman is a Mexican-American actress. Her breakthrough role was in the 2011 Mexican crime drama film Miss Bala. She has gone on to appear in Pioneer (2013), Spectre (2015), Going Under (2016), and Annabelle: Creation (2017). On television, Sigman starred in Narcos (2015) and S.W.A.T (2017) for the first and second seasons of both series.

Early life and family
Sigman was born in Ciudad Obregón, Sonora, Mexico, to a Mexican mother and an American father, Lee Sigman, a New York Yankees scout from Kansas. She is a U.S. citizen through her father. Her brother, baseball player Kenneth Ray Sigman, was formerly married to actress Barbara Mori.

Career
Sigman began her career appearing on Mexican television, before making her film debut in Rio de Oro. In 2011, she played the leading role of Laura Guerrero in the Mexican crime drama film, Miss Bala. The film was selected as the Mexican entry for the Best Foreign Language Film at the 84th Academy Awards, but it did not make the final shortlist. Sigman was nominated for a Dublin Film Critics' Circle Award in 2011 for her performance in film. The following year, she played Catalina Aguado in the Canadian documentary film Flight of the Butterflies. In 2013, Sigman co-starred in the Norwegian thriller Pioneer.

In 2013, Sigman played the leading role in the USA Network drama pilot The Arrangement opposite Bryan Greenberg. It was not ordered to series. Later that year, she was cast in a recurring role on the FX crime drama series The Bridge. She also starred in the Arctic Monkeys music video for "Snap Out of It" in 2014. In 2015, Sigman played Valeria Vélez, character based on Virginia Vallejo, in the Netflix crime thriller, Narcos.

In 2015, Sigman appeared in the James Bond film Spectre, becoming the second Mexican actress to play a Bond girl after Linda Christian first played the role of Valerie Mathis in the 1954 TV adaptation of Casino Royale. She later was cast as a female lead in the action comedy Going Under, as well as War on Everyone.

In 2016, Sigman had a recurring role as Monica Ava during the second season of the ABC anthology drama series American Crime created by John Ridley. Ridley later cast Sigman in the leading role as Presence Foster, the former Army veteran who finds herself as unlicensed Private Investigator, in the ABC detective drama pilot, Presence.

In 2017, Sigman began playing Jessica Cortez, captain and commanding officer of the LAPD Metropolitan Division in S.W.A.T.. She exited at the start of the third season, when her character left to pursue FBI training.

Sigman starred as Sister Charlotte in the 2017 horror film Annabelle: Creation.

Personal life
Sigman is married to Brian Andrew Mendoza. They have a child born in 2019.

Filmography

Film

Television

References

External links

Living people
People from Ciudad Obregón
Actresses from Sonora
21st-century Mexican actresses
21st-century American actresses
Mexican people of American descent
American actresses of Mexican descent
Mexican film actresses
American film actresses
Hispanic and Latino American actresses
1987 births